Sun Yue (born July 30, 1986) is a Chinese female curler.

Teams

Women's

Mixed doubles

References

External links
 

Living people
1986 births
Chinese female curlers

Pacific-Asian curling champions
Competitors at the 2007 Winter Universiade
Competitors at the 2011 Winter Universiade
Continental Cup of Curling participants
Asian Games medalists in curling
Curlers at the 2007 Asian Winter Games
Medalists at the 2007 Asian Winter Games
Asian Games bronze medalists for China
21st-century Chinese women